Paramiella incisa is a species of a land snail with gills and an operculum, a terrestrial gastropod mollusk in the family Neocyclotidae. This species is endemic to Micronesia.

References

Fauna of Micronesia
Neocyclotidae
Taxonomy articles created by Polbot